Harold Holdsworth & Co (Wakefield) Ltd v Caddies [1955] 1 WLR 352 is a UK company law case, concerning the proper interpretation of a company's articles. It held that someone with the title of "managing director" has no special powers, unless the articles say them expressly.

Facts
Mr Holdsworth became the managing director of the textile company after a buyout. But then the parent became dissatisfied and purported to move his duties to a subsidiary. He sued for breach of contract.

Judgment
Earl Jowitt held that the position of managing director did not have some special company law meaning. So the appointment clause was broad enough that if he remained any old director, there was no breach of agreement.

See also

UK company law
Hely-Hutchinson v Brayhead Ltd [1968] 1 QB 549

Notes

References

United Kingdom company case law
House of Lords cases
1955 in case law
1955 in British law
Businesspeople in textiles